Every Young Man's Battle is a best-selling Christian book written by Stephen Arterburn, Fred Stoeker and Mike Yorkey that also covers opposition to premarital sex, and pornography for teenage boys. The book is part of a media franchise of books like Every Young Woman's Battle, that frequently are on the top 100 Christian book sales lists.

It was published by WaterBrook Press, a division of Random House.

In September 2006, Fred Stoeker published a spin-off to Every Young Man's Battle entitled Tactics.

References

Self-help books
Books about Christianity
Sexuality in Christianity